The San Francisco Film Critics Circle Award for Best Picture is one of the awards given by the San Francisco Film Critics Circle to honor the finest achievements in filmmaking.

Winners

2000s

2010s

2020s

Awards for best film
Lists of films by award